Raphaël Dupau (13 September 1900 – 14 June 1971) was a French racing cyclist. He rode in the 1926 Tour de France.

References

1900 births
1971 deaths
French male cyclists
Place of birth missing